Rosemary Murphy (January 13, 1925 – July 5, 2014) was a German-American actress of stage, film, and television. She was nominated for three Tony Awards for her stage work, as well as two Emmy Awards for television work, winning once, for her performance in Eleanor and Franklin (1976).

Biography and career
Murphy was born in Munich, Germany in 1925, the daughter of American parents Mildred (née Taylor) and Robert Daniel Murphy, a diplomat. The family left Germany in 1939 due to the onset of World War II.

Education
Murphy, whose résumé came to include French and German films, attended Manhattanville College and trained as an actress at Catholic University of America in Washington, D.C., and in New York at the Neighborhood Playhouse and the Actors Studio with Sanford Meisner before beginning her career on stage.

Stage
She made her stage debut in Germany, in a 1949 production of Peer Gynt. She made her Broadway debut in 1950 in The Tower Beyond Tragedy. She went on to appear in some 15 Broadway productions, most recently in Noël Coward's Waiting in the Wings (1999).

Film and television

Murphy also acted in films and on TV, most notably portraying Sara Delano Roosevelt in the TV miniseries Eleanor and Franklin (1976) and Eleanor and Franklin: The White House Years (1977). She played Maudie Atkinson in To Kill a Mockingbird (1962) as well as Callie Hacker in Walking Tall (1973). The following year, in 1974, she appeared in the television film A Case of Rape, playing a ruthless defense attorney who brutally cross-examines a rape victim (played by Elizabeth Montgomery) and wins an acquittal for the man who attacked her.  In 1974–75, she played high-school principal Margaret Blumenthal in the series Lucas Tanner.

Her first soap opera role was Nola Hollister #2 on The Secret Storm (1969–1970).  In 1977, she appeared on All My Children as Maureen Teller Dalton, Eric Kane's former mistress, and the mother of his son, Mark Dalton. In 1988, she played Loretta Fowler for several months, the kleptomaniac mother of Mitch Blake and Sam Fowler on Another World. The following year, she appeared on As the World Turns as Gretel Aldin #2 (a role previously played by Joan Copeland) when her character's son, James Stenbeck, was allegedly murdered.

She also appeared in episodes of Columbo (1974) and Murder, She Wrote (1987).

Awards
Murphy won an Emmy Award for her role in Eleanor and Franklin. She also won a Clarence Derwent Award and an Outer Critics Circle Award and was nominated for three Tony awards.

Death
She died on July 5, 2014 in Manhattan, from esophageal cancer. She never married.

Filmography

Television films

Partial Television Credits

References

External links

Rosemary Murphy at the University of Wisconsin's Actors Studio audio collection

1925 births
2014 deaths
American expatriates in Germany
American film actresses
American stage actresses
American television actresses
Actresses from New York City
Manhattanville College alumni
Deaths from esophageal cancer
Deaths from cancer in New York (state)
Emmy Award winners
Primetime Emmy Award winners
Outstanding Performance by a Supporting Actress in a Miniseries or Movie Primetime Emmy Award winners
21st-century American women